Erynnis marloyi, commonly known as the inky skipper, is a species of butterfly in the family Hesperiidae. It is found in south-eastern Europe (Greece and the Balkans) across Asia Minor to Syria, Turkey, Lebanon, southern Iran and Chitral, Pakistan.

The wingspan is 14–15 mm for males and 15–16 mm for females. Adults are on wing from May to June.

The larvae feed on Rosaceae species.

External links
 Moths and Butterflies of Europe and North Africa 
 Russian Insects
 Erynnis marloyi at Butterfly Conservation Armenia

Erynnis
Butterflies of Asia
Butterflies of Europe
Butterflies described in 1834